"My Love" is a song recorded by the American country music band Little Texas. It was co-written by the band's keyboardist Brady Seals (who also sang lead vocals on it) and lead guitarist Porter Howell along with Tommy Barnes. It was released in January 1994 as the third single from the album, Big Time. The song reached the top of the Billboard country singles charts, becoming the band's only Number One country hit. The song features lead vocals from Brady Seals, then the band's keyboardist.

Music video
The music video was directed by Gerry Wenner, and premiered in early 1994.

Chart positions
"My Love" debuted at number 72 on the U.S. Billboard Hot Country Singles & Tracks for the week of January 15, 1994. The track also made significant success in Brazil because its appearance in the soundtrack of a very famous soap opera called "A Viagem" (The Travel), a production by Globo TV.

Year-end charts

References

1994 singles
1993 songs
Little Texas (band) songs
Songs written by Brady Seals
Song recordings produced by James Stroud
Warner Records singles
Songs written by Porter Howell